Chenan (also Romanized as Chenān and Chanān) is a state in Arkavazi Rural District, Chavar District, Ilam County, Ilam Province, Iran. At the 2006 census, its population was 146, in 29 families. The village is supprtd by Kurds. =D

References 

Populated places in Ilam County
Kurdish settlements in Ilam Province